Terry Board may refer to:

 Terry Board (footballer, born 1945), Australian rules footballer for Carlton from 1965 to 1968
 Terry Board (footballer, born 1968), Australian rules footballer for Fitzroy from 1988 to 1991